Harrison Township is one of twenty townships in Benton County, Iowa, USA.  As of the 2000 census, its population was 354.

History
Harrison Township was founded in 1849.

Geography
According to the United States Census Bureau, Harrison Township covers an area of 27.05 square miles (70.07 square kilometers); of this, 26.57 square miles (68.81 square kilometers, 98.2 percent) is land and 0.48 square miles (1.25 square kilometers, 1.78 percent) is water.

Adjacent townships
 Jefferson Township, Buchanan County (north)
 Homer Township, Buchanan County (northeast)
 Polk Township (east)
 Taylor Township (south)
 Cedar Township (west)

Cemeteries
The township contains Bear Creek Cemetery.

Major highways
  Interstate 380
  Iowa Highway 150

Landmarks
 Minne Estema Park
 Mount Auburn Bridge Park

School districts
 Independence Community School District
 Vinton-Shellsburg Community School District

Political districts
 Iowa's 1st congressional district
 State House District 75
 State Senate District 38

References
 United States Census Bureau 2007 TIGER/Line Shapefiles
 United States Board on Geographic Names (GNIS)
 United States National Atlas

External links

 
US-Counties.com
City-Data.com

Townships in Benton County, Iowa
Cedar Rapids, Iowa metropolitan area
Townships in Iowa
1849 establishments in Iowa
Populated places established in 1849